Asteron is a genus of spiders in the family Zodariidae. It was first described in 1991 by Jocqué. , it contains 8 Australian species.

Species
Asteron comprises the following species:
Asteron biperforatum Jocqué & Baehr, 2001
Asteron grayi Jocqué & Baehr, 2001
Asteron hunti Jocqué & Baehr, 2001
Asteron inflatum Jocqué & Baehr, 2001
Asteron quintum Jocqué & Baehr, 2001
Asteron reticulatum Jocqué, 1991
Asteron tasmaniense Jocqué & Baehr, 2001
Asteron zabkai Jocqué & Baehr, 2001

References

Zodariidae
Araneomorphae genera
Spiders of Australia